The Max Planck medal is the highest award of the German Physical Society , the world's largest organization of physicists, for extraordinary achievements in theoretical physics. The prize has been awarded annually since 1929, with few exceptions, and usually to a single person. The winner is awarded with a gold medal and hand-written parchment.

In 1943 it was not possible to manufacture the gold medal because the Berlin foundry was hit by a bomb. The board of directors of the German Physical Society decided to manufacture the medals in a substitute metal and to deliver the gold medals later.

The highest award of the German Physical Society for outstanding results in experimental physics is the Stern–Gerlach Medal.

List of recipients

2023 Rashid A. Sunyaev
2022 Annette Zippelius
2021 Alexander Markovich Polyakov
2020 Andrzej Buras
2019 Detlef Lohse
2018 Juan Ignacio Cirac
2017 Herbert Spohn
2016 Herbert Wagner
2015 Viatcheslav Mukhanov
2014 David Ruelle
2013 Werner Nahm
2012 Martin Zirnbauer
2011 Giorgio Parisi
2010 Dieter Vollhardt
2009 Robert Graham
2008 Detlev Buchholz
2007 Joel Lebowitz
2006 Wolfgang Götze
2005 Peter Zoller
2004 Klaus Hepp
2003 Martin Gutzwiller
2002 Jürgen Ehlers
2001 Jürg Fröhlich
2000 Martin Lüscher
1999 Pierre Hohenberg
1998 Raymond Stora
1997 Gerald E. Brown
1996 Ludvig Faddeev
1995 Siegfried Grossmann
1994 Hans-Jürgen Borchers
1993 Kurt Binder
1992 Elliott H. Lieb
1991 Wolfhart Zimmermann
1990 Hermann Haken
1989 Bruno Zumino
1988 Valentine Bargmann
1987 Julius Wess
1986 Franz Wegner
1985 Yoichiro Nambu
1984 Res Jost
1983 Nicholas Kemmer
1982 Hans-Arwed Weidenmüller
1981 Kurt Symanzik
1980 not awarded
1979 Markus Fierz
1978 Paul Peter Ewald
1977 Walter Thirring
1976 Ernst Stueckelberg
1975 Gregor Wentzel
1974 Léon Van Hove
1973 Nikolay Bogolyubov
1972 Herbert Fröhlich
1971 not awarded
1970 Rudolf Haag
1969 Freeman Dyson
1968 Walter Heitler
1967 Harry Lehmann
1966 Gerhart Lüders
1965 not awarded
1964 Samuel Goudsmit and George Uhlenbeck
1963 Rudolf Peierls
1962 Ralph Kronig
1961 Eugene Wigner
1960 Lev Landau
1959 Oskar Klein
1958 Wolfgang Pauli
1957 Carl Friedrich von Weizsäcker
1956 Victor Weisskopf
1955 Hans Bethe
1954 Enrico Fermi
1953 Walther Bothe
1952 Paul Dirac
1951 James Franck and Gustav Hertz
1950 Peter Debye
1949  Lise Meitner and Otto Hahn
1948 Max Born
1945–1947 not awarded
1944 Walther Kossel
1943 Friedrich Hund
1942 Pascual Jordan
1939–1941 not awarded
1938 Louis de Broglie
1937 Erwin Schrödinger
1934–1936 not awarded
1933 Werner Heisenberg
1932 Max von Laue
1931 Arnold Sommerfeld
1930 Niels Bohr
1929 Max Planck and Albert Einstein

See also

 List of physics awards
 Max Planck

References

External links

 
 

Awards of the German Physical Society
Awards established in 1929
1929 establishments in Germany